Amul Bhatt is an Indian politician. He is a Member of the Gujarat Legislative Assembly from the Maninagar Assembly constituency since December 2022. He is associated with the Bharatiya Janata Party.

References 

Gujarat Legislative Assembly
Bharatiya Janata Party of Gujarat
Year of birth missing (living people)
Living people